Gardening is the practice of growing and cultivating plants as part of horticulture. In gardens, ornamental plants are often grown for their flowers, foliage, or overall appearance; useful plants, such as root vegetables, leaf vegetables, fruits, and herbs, are grown for consumption, for use as dyes, or for medicinal or cosmetic use.

Gardening ranges in scale from fruit orchards, to long boulevard plantings with one or more different types of shrubs, trees, and herbaceous plants, to residential back gardens including lawns and foundation plantings, all the way to container gardens grown inside or outside. Gardening may be very specialized, with only one type of plant grown, or involve a variety of plants in mixed plantings. It involves an active participation in the growing of plants, and tends to be labor-intensive, which differentiates it from farming or forestry.

History

Ancient times
Forest gardening, a forest-based food production system, is the world's oldest form of gardening. Forest gardens originated in prehistoric times along jungle-clad river banks and in the wet foothills of monsoon regions. In the gradual process of families improving their immediate environment, useful tree and vine species were identified, protected and improved while undesirable species were eliminated. Eventually foreign species were also selected and incorporated into the gardens.

After the emergence of the first civilizations, wealthy individuals began to create gardens for aesthetic purposes. Ancient Egyptian tomb paintings from the New Kingdom (around 1500 BC) provide some of the earliest physical evidence of ornamental horticulture and landscape design; they depict lotus ponds surrounded by symmetrical rows of acacias and palms. A notable example of ancient ornamental gardens were the Hanging Gardens of Babylon—one of the Seven Wonders of the Ancient World —while ancient Rome had dozens of gardens.

Wealthy ancient Egyptians used gardens for providing shade. Egyptians associated trees and gardens with gods, believing that their deities were pleased by gardens. Gardens in ancient Egypt were often surrounded by walls with trees planted in rows. Among the most popular species planted were date palms, sycamores, fig trees, nut trees, and willows. These gardens were a sign of higher socioeconomic status. In addition, wealthy ancient Egyptians grew vineyards, as wine was a sign of the higher social classes. Roses, poppies, daisies and irises could all also be found in the gardens of the Egyptians.

Assyria was also renowned for its beautiful gardens. These tended to be wide and large, some of them used for hunting game—rather like a game reserve today—and others as leisure gardens. Cypresses and palms were some of the most frequently planted types of trees.

Gardens were also available in Kush. In Musawwarat es-Sufra, the Great Enclosure dated to the 3rd century BC included splendid gardens.

Ancient Roman gardens were laid out with hedges and vines and contained a wide variety of flowers—acanthus, cornflowers, crocus, cyclamen, hyacinth, iris, ivy, lavender, lilies, myrtle, narcissus, poppy, rosemary and violets—as well as statues and sculptures. Flower beds were popular in the courtyards of rich Romans.

The Middle Ages

The Middle Ages represent a period of decline in gardens for aesthetic purposes. After the fall of Rome, gardening was done for the purpose of growing medicinal herbs and/or decorating church altars. Monasteries carried on a tradition of garden design and intense horticultural techniques during the medieval period in Europe.
Generally, monastic garden types consisted of kitchen gardens, infirmary gardens, cemetery orchards, cloister garths and vineyards. Individual monasteries might also have had a "green court", a plot of grass and trees where horses could graze, as well as a cellarer's garden or private gardens for obedientiaries, monks who held specific posts within the monastery.

Islamic gardens were built after the model of Persian gardens and they were usually enclosed by walls and divided in four by watercourses. Commonly, the centre of the garden would have a reflecting pool or pavilion. Specific to the Islamic gardens are the mosaics and glazed tiles used to decorate the rills and fountains that were built in these gardens.

By the late 13th century, rich Europeans began to grow gardens for leisure and for medicinal herbs and vegetables. They surrounded the gardens by walls to protect them from animals and to provide seclusion. During the next two centuries, Europeans started planting lawns and raising flowerbeds and trellises of roses. Fruit trees were common in these gardens and also in some, there were turf seats. At the same time, the gardens in the monasteries were a place to grow flowers and medicinal herbs but they were also a space where the monks could enjoy nature and relax.

The gardens in the 16th and 17th century were symmetric, proportioned and balanced with a more classical appearance. Most of these gardens were built around a central axis and they were divided into different parts by hedges. Commonly, gardens had flowerbeds laid out in squares and separated by gravel paths.

Gardens in Renaissance were adorned with sculptures, topiary and fountains. In the 17th century, knot gardens became popular along with the hedge mazes. By this time, Europeans started planting new flowers such as tulips, marigolds and sunflowers.

Cottage gardens

Cottage gardens, which emerged in Elizabethan times, appear to have originated as a local source for herbs and fruits. One theory is that they arose out of the Black Death of the 1340s, when the death of so many laborers made land available for small cottages with personal gardens. According to the late 19th-century legend of origin, these gardens were originally created by the workers that lived in the cottages of the villages, to provide them with food and herbs, with flowers planted among them for decoration. Farm workers were provided with cottages that had architectural quality set in a small garden—about —where they could grow food and keep pigs and chickens.

Authentic gardens of the yeoman cottager would have included a beehive and livestock, and frequently a pig and sty, along with a well. The peasant cottager of medieval times was more interested in meat than flowers, with herbs grown for medicinal use rather than for their beauty. By Elizabethan times there was more prosperity, and thus more room to grow flowers. Even the early cottage garden flowers typically had their practical use—violets were spread on the floor (for their pleasant scent and keeping out vermin); calendulas and primroses were both attractive and used in cooking. Others, such as sweet William and hollyhocks, were grown entirely for their beauty.

18th century

In the 18th century, gardens were laid out more naturally, without any walls. This style of smooth undulating grass, which would run straight to the house, clumps, belts and scattering of trees and his serpentine lakes formed by invisibly damming small rivers, were a new style within the English landscape, a "gardenless" form of landscape gardening, which swept away almost all the remnants of previous formally patterned styles. The English landscape garden usually included a lake, lawns set against groves of trees, and often contained shrubberies, grottoes, pavilions, bridges and follies such as mock temples, Gothic ruins, bridges, and other picturesque architecture, designed to recreate an idyllic pastoral landscape. This new style emerged in England in the early 18th century, and spread across Europe, replacing the more formal, symmetrical garden à la française of the 17th century as the principal gardening style of Europe. The English garden presented an idealized view of nature. They were often inspired by paintings of landscapes by Claude Lorraine and Nicolas Poussin, and some were Influenced by the classic Chinese gardens of the East, which had recently been described by European travelers.  The work of Lancelot 'Capability' Brown was particularly influential. Also, in 1804 the Horticultural Society was formed.

Gardens of the 19th century contained plants such as the monkey puzzle or Chile pine. This is also the time when the so-called "gardenesque" style of gardens evolved. These gardens displayed a wide variety of flowers in a rather small space. Rock gardens increased in popularity in the 19th century.

In ancient India, patterns from sacred geometry and mandalas were used to design gardens. Distinct mandala patterns denoted specific deities, planets, or even constellations. Such a garden was also referred to as a 'Mandala Vaatika'. The word 'Vaatika' can mean garden, plantation or parterre.

Types

Residential gardening takes place near the home, in a space referred to as the garden. Although a garden typically is located on the land near a residence, it may also be located on a roof, in an atrium, on a balcony, in a window box, on a patio or vivarium.

Gardening also takes place in non-residential green areas, such as parks, public or semi-public gardens (botanical gardens or zoological gardens), amusement parks, along transportation corridors, and around tourist attractions and garden hotels. In these situations, a staff of gardeners or groundskeepers maintains the gardens.
 Indoor gardening is concerned with the growing of houseplants within a residence or building, in a conservatory, or in a greenhouse. Indoor gardens are sometimes incorporated as part of air conditioning or heating systems. Indoor gardening extends the growing season in the fall and spring and can be used for winter gardening.
 Native plant gardening is concerned with the use of native plants with or without the intent of creating wildlife habitat. The goal is to create a garden in harmony with, and adapted to a given area. This type of gardening typically reduces water usage, maintenance, and fertilization costs, while increasing native faunal interest.
 Water gardening is concerned with growing plants adapted to pools and ponds. Bog gardens are also considered a type of water garden. These all require special conditions and considerations. A simple water garden may consist solely of a tub containing the water and plant(s). In aquascaping, a garden is created within an aquarium tank.
 Container gardening is concerned with growing plants in any type of container either indoors or outdoors. Common containers are pots, hanging baskets, and planters. Container gardening is usually used in atriums and on balconies, patios, and roof tops.
 Hügelkultur is concerned with growing plants on piles of rotting wood, as a form of raised bed gardening and composting in situ. An English loanword from German, it means "mound garden." Toby Hemenway, noted permaculture author and teacher, considers wood buried in trenches to also be a form of hugelkultur referred to as a dead wood swale. Hugelkultur is practiced by Sepp Holzer as a method of forest gardening and agroforestry, and by Geoff Lawton as a method of dryland farming and desert greening. When used as a method of disposing of large volumes of waste wood and woody debris, hugelkultur accomplishes carbon sequestration. It is also a form of xeriscaping.
 Community gardening is a social activity in which an area of land is gardened by a group of people, providing access to fresh produce, herbs, flowers and plants as well as access to satisfying labor, neighborhood improvement, sense of community and connection to the environment. Community gardens are typically owned in trust by local governments or nonprofits.
 Garden sharing partners landowners with gardeners in need of land. These shared gardens, typically front or back yards, are usually used to produce food that is divided between the two parties. 
 Organic gardening uses natural, sustainable methods, fertilizers and pesticides to grow non-genetically modified crops.
Biodynamic gardening or biodynamic agriculture is similar to organic gardening, but includes various esoteric concepts drawn from the ideas of Rudolf Steiner, such as astrological sowing and planting calendar and particular field and compost preparations.
Commercial gardening is a more intensive type of gardening that involves the production of vegetables, nontropical fruits, and flowers from local farmers. Commercial gardening began because farmers would sell locally to stop food from spoiling faster because of the transportation of goods from a far distance. Mediterranean agriculture is also a common practice that commercial gardeners use. Mediterranean agriculture is the practice of cultivating animals such as sheep to help weed and provide manure for vine crops, grains, or citrus. Gardeners can easily train these animals to not eat the actual plant.

Social aspects
People can express their political or social views in gardens, intentionally or not. The lawn vs. garden issue is played out in urban planning as the debate over the "land ethic" that is to determine urban land use and whether hyper hygienist bylaws (e.g. weed control) should apply, or whether land should generally be allowed to exist in its natural wild state. In a famous Canadian Charter of Rights case, "Sandra Bell vs. City of Toronto", 1997, the right to cultivate all native species, even most varieties deemed noxious or allergenic, was upheld as part of the right of free expression.

Community gardening comprises a wide variety of approaches to sharing land and gardens.

People often surround their house and garden with a hedge. Common hedge plants are privet, hawthorn, beech, yew, leyland cypress, hemlock, arborvitae, barberry, box, holly, oleander, forsythia and lavender. The idea of open gardens without hedges may be distasteful to those who enjoy privacy.
The Slow Food movement has sought in some countries to add an edible school yard and garden classrooms to schools, e.g. in Fergus, Ontario, where these were added to a public school to augment the kitchen classroom. Garden sharing, where urban landowners allow gardeners to grow on their property in exchange for a share of the harvest, is associated with the desire to control the quality of one's food, and reconnect with soil and community.

In US and British usage, the production of ornamental plantings around buildings is called landscaping, landscape maintenance or grounds keeping, while international usage uses the term gardening for these same activities.

Also gaining popularity is the concept of "Green Gardening" which involves growing plants using organic fertilizers and pesticides so that the gardening process – or the flowers and fruits produced thereby – doesn't adversely affect the environment or people's health in any manner.

Benefits 
Gardening is considered by many people to be a relaxing activity. There are also many studies about the positive effects on mental and physical health in relation to gardening. Specifically, gardening is thought to increase self-esteem and reduce stress. As writer and former teacher Sarah Biddle notes, one's garden may become a "tiny oasis to relax and recharge [one's] batteries." Involving in gardening activities aid in creativity, observational skills, learning, planning and physical movement.

Others consider gardening to be a good hedge against supply chain disruptions with increased worries that the public cannot always trust that the grocery store shelves will be fully stocked. In April 2022, about 31% of grocery products were out of stock which is an 11% increase from November 2021.

Gardening can also support good numbers and a wide range of pollinators, but worryingly bees and other pollinators are in decline. Gardeners can make a difference to help reverse this trend. The main thing that matters is that they get their share of nectar to fuel their busy lifestyles, and this is where gardening can help them.

Comparison with farming

Gardening for beauty is likely nearly as old as farming for food, however for most of history for the majority of people there was no real distinction since the need for food and other useful products trumped other concerns. Small-scale, subsistence agriculture (called hoe-farming) is largely indistinguishable from gardening. A patch of potatoes grown by a Peruvian peasant or an Irish smallholder for personal use could be described as either a garden or a farm. Gardening for average people evolved as a separate discipline, more concerned with aesthetics, recreation and leisure, under the influence of the pleasure gardens of the wealthy. Meanwhile, farming has evolved (in developed countries) in the direction of commercialization, economics of scale, and monocropping.

In respect to its food-producing purpose, gardening is distinguished from farming chiefly by scale and intent. Farming occurs on a larger scale, and with the production of salable goods as a major motivation. Gardening happens on a smaller scale, primarily for pleasure and to produce goods for the gardener's own family or community. There is some overlap between the terms, particularly in that some moderate-sized vegetable growing concerns, often called market gardening, can fit in either category.

The key distinction between gardening and farming is essentially one of scale; gardening can be a hobby or an income supplement, but farming is generally understood as a full-time or commercial activity, usually involving more land and quite different practices. One distinction is that gardening is labor-intensive and employs very little infrastructural capital, sometimes no more than a few tools, e.g. a spade, hoe, basket and watering can. By contrast, larger-scale farming often involves irrigation systems, chemical fertilizers and harvesters or at least ladders, e.g. to reach up into fruit trees. However, this distinction is becoming blurred with the increasing use of power tools in even small gardens.

Monty Don has speculated on an atavistic connection between present-day gardeners and pre-modern peasantry.

The term precision agriculture is sometimes used to describe gardening using intermediate technology (more than tools, less than harvesters), especially of organic varieties. Gardening is effectively scaled up to feed entire villages of over 100 people from specialized plots. A variant is the community garden which offers plots to urban dwellers.

Ornaments and accessories

There is a wide range of garden ornaments and accessories available in the market for both the professional gardener and the amateur to exercise their creativity. These are used to add decoration or functionality, and may be made from a wide range of materials such as copper, stone, wood, bamboo, stainless steel, clay, stained glass, concrete, or iron. Examples include trellis, garden furniture, gnomes, statues, outdoor fireplaces, fountains, rain chains, urns, bird baths and feeders, wind chimes, and garden lighting such as candle lanterns and oil lamps. The use of these items can be part of the expression of a gardener's gardening personality.

As art

Garden design is considered to be an art in most cultures, distinguished from gardening, which generally means garden maintenance. Garden design can include different themes such as perennial, butterfly, wildlife, Japanese, water, tropical, or shade gardens.

In Japan, Samurai and Zen monks were often required to build decorative gardens or practice related skills like flower arrangement known as ikebana. In 18th-century Europe, country estates were refashioned by landscape gardeners into formal gardens or landscaped park lands, such as at Versailles, France, or Stowe, England. Today, landscape architects and garden designers continue to produce artistically creative designs for private garden spaces. In the US, professional landscape designers are certified by the Association of Professional Landscape Designers.

Pests
Garden pests are generally plants, fungi, or animals (frequently insects) that engage in activity that the gardener considers undesirable. A pest may crowd out desirable plants, disturb soil, stunt the growth of young seedlings, steal or damage fruit, or otherwise kill plants, hamper their growth, damage their appearance, or reduce the quality of the edible or ornamental portions of the plant. Aphids, spider mites, slugs, snails, ants, birds, and even cats are commonly considered to be garden pests.

Because gardeners may have different goals, organisms considered "garden pests" vary from gardener to gardener. Tropaeolum speciosum, for example, may be considered a desirable and ornamental garden plant, or it may be considered a pest if it seeds and starts to grow where it is not wanted. As another example, in lawns, moss can become dominant and be impossible to eradicate. In some lawns, lichens, especially very damp lawn lichens such as Peltigera lactucfolia and P. membranacea, can become difficult to control and are considered pests.

Pest control
There are many ways by which unwanted pests are removed from a garden. The techniques vary depending on the pest, the gardener's goals, and the gardener's philosophy. For example, snails may be dealt with through the use of a chemical pesticide, an organic pesticide, hand-picking, barriers, or simply growing snail-resistant plants.

Pest control is often done through the use of pesticides, which may be either organic or artificially synthesized. Pesticides may affect the ecology of a garden due to their effects on the populations of both target and non-target species. For example, unintended exposure to some neonicotinoid pesticides has been proposed as a factor in the recent decline in honey bee populations. A mole vibrator can deter mole activity in a garden.

Other means of control include the removal of infected plants, using fertilizers and biostimulants to improve the health and vigour of plants so they better resist attack, practising crop rotation to prevent pest build-up, using companion planting, and practising good garden hygiene, such as disinfecting tools and clearing debris and weeds which may harbour pests.

Garden guns 

Garden guns are smooth-bore shotguns specifically made to fire .22 caliber snake shot, and are commonly used by gardeners and farmers for pest control. Garden guns are short-range weapons that can do little harm past  and are relatively quiet when fired with snake shot, compared to a standard ammunition. These guns are especially effective inside of barns and sheds, as the snake shot will not shoot holes in the roof or walls, or more importantly injure livestock with a ricochet. They are also used for pest control at airports, warehouses, stockyards, etc.

See also

 Arboretum
 Bonsai
 Cultigen
 Eyecatchers
 Garden writing
 Growbag
 Introduced species
 Impact gardening
 List of gardening topics
 List of horticulture and gardening books
 List of professional gardeners
 Master gardener program
 No-dig gardening

References

External links

 National Gardening Association (USA)